Don Ford (1921–1965) was an influential American science fiction fan from Ohio.

Don began reading science fiction in 1930, and his lifelong love of the genre led him into fandom where he made many notable contributions in fan writing, fanzine editing and convention-running. He possessed a notably large SF magazine collection. He was a leading member of the Cincinnati Fantasy Group (CFG) and a founder member of First Fandom. He attended the 1948 Worldcon in Toronto and in 1949 he chaired Cinvention, the seventh Worldcon in Cincinnati. In 1950 he founded and chaired the first Midwestcon. Well connected to fans in both the UK and US, he worked with Walt Willis to develop TAFF and he was the first TAFF US administrator.  He won the 1959 TAFF race, attending the 1960 Eastercon in London. He died unexpectedly on 2 April 1965 at the age of 44 from cancer.

External links 
Don Ford TAFF Biography
TAFF History
1959 TAFF result
Cincinnati SF Group History
Don Ford obituary

1921 births
1965 deaths